Fredonia-Moccasin Unified School District is a school district headquartered in Fredonia, Arizona, United States.

The schools operated by the district include Fredonia Elementary/Middle School and Fredonia High School; both are in Fredonia. The district serves Fredonia and unincorporated Coconino County communities close to the Grand Canyon National Park, such as the Kaibab Indian Reservation.

Within Coconino County it serves, in addition to Fredonia: Greenehaven and sections of Page. A small section of Grand Canyon Village coincides with the district. The district also serves sections of Mohave County. There it serves sections of the Kaibab Reservation, including Kaibab and Moccasin. It also serves most of Cane Beds.

References

External links
 

School districts in Coconino County, Arizona
School districts in Mohave County, Arizona